Frederiek Nolf (10 February 1987 – 5 February 2009) was a Belgian professional road bicycle racer, who died in Doha in his sleep of an apparent heart attack between stages 4 and 5 of the 2009 Tour of Qatar.  Nolf was born in Kortrijk.  He was a friend of cyclist Wouter Weylandt, who died two years after Nolf, in a racing accident in May 2011.

References

External links
 

Belgian male cyclists
1987 births
2009 deaths
Sportspeople from Kortrijk
Cyclists from West Flanders